A business oligarch is generally a business magnate who controls sufficient resources to influence national politics. A business leader can be considered an oligarch if the following conditions are satisfied:
 uses monopolistic tactics to dominate an industry;
 possesses sufficient political power to promote their own interests;
 controls multiple businesses, which intensively coordinate their activities.

More generally, an oligarch is a "member of an oligarchy; a person who is part of a small group holding power in a state".

See also 
 Gilded age
 Russian oligarchs
 Ukrainian oligarchs
 Oligarchy
 Tai-pan
 Chaebol

References 

Social groups
Wealth concentration
Oligarchy
Post-Soviet states